Alpha-L-rhamnosidase (alpha-L-rhamnosidase T, alpha-L-rhamnosidase N) is an enzyme with systematic name alpha-L-rhamnoside rhamnohydrolase. This enzyme catalyses the following chemical reaction

 Hydrolysis of terminal non-reducing alpha-L-rhamnose residues in alpha-L-rhamnosides

References

External links 

EC 3.2.1